Walter Aipolani is a Hawaiian musician: a singer, guitarist, and songwriter. He was born in Keaukaha near Hilo, and moved to Oahu as a child with his family. In the 1980s, he began playing gigs in Waikiki, and became known as Bruddah Waltah. He has also been called the Father of Hawaiian Reggae as he and bands he played with, such as Island Afternoon, popularized Hawaiian-style reggae music in the 1980s and 1990s. 

Aipolani’s first performances, in 1980, were with his brothers, in their band Aku Palu (which means “Bloody Fish Guts”). Tragically, their manager was shot just as they were preparing to release their first recording, and the band broke up, to play for a time with their uncle’s Hawaiian music group, Na Mele Kani. Their sister, a dancer and musician who was performing in New Zealand, had sent the brothers a cassette tape of Bob Marley's music. Later, as the brothers learned more about Rasta culture and music, they started a series of free concerts in Honolulu in 1983, called Tumbleland Jams. 

One of Walter Aipolani's most famous works, "Sweet Lady of Waiāhole," describes a well-known local fruit vendor, Fujiko Shimabukuro.  Another song, “Keep Hawaiian Lands” was inspired by Bob Marley’s “Waiting in Vain”. In his covers of reggae classics such as No Woman No Cry, Waltah changed many of the lyrics to fit the particularities of Hawaiian culture and politics:
By relocating Marley’s smash hit to Hawai‘i, Aipolani’s lyrics reverberate strongly with Native Hawaiians; by using Marley’s song and identity, Aipolani links the conditions of poverty and oppression experienced by Native Hawaiians to those experienced by Jamaicans . . . its relationship with ‘‘Keep Hawaiian Lands’’ turns it into a patriotic song demonstrating love for the land, an anthem of protest against development, colonial dispossession, and Western encroachment. The chorus, ‘‘Ua mau ke ea o ka ‘a ̄ina i ka pono (the life of the Land is perpetuated in righteousness)’’ is often recognized as the government motto for the state of Hawai‘i.

Waltah's first recorded album Hawaiian Reggae – with backup band Island Afternoon – was a top hit in Hawaii in the early 1990s, selling nearly 100,000 cassette tapes as the Hawaiian reggae, or Jawaiian craze took off. Aipolani and several other Hawaiian reggae musicians disliked the term “Jawaiian”, preferring to describe their music as Hawaiian. The term Jawaiian sparked controversy, with some musicians and critics feeling it was disrespectful to both Hawaiian and Jamaican cultures. 

Aipolani was influenced by Bob Marley, Elton John, Creedence Clearwater Revival, The Bee Gees, and The Beatles, He has played with Ryan Hiraoka, Keaka Kawaauhau, HHB, Dirty Roots, Mana‘o Company, Sons of Yeshua, and Ho‘aikane. He has also toured extensively, opening for Steel Pulse, Gregory Isaacs, Inner Circle, UB40, and other top 40 musicians. His brothers, and a sister, were also musicians, as is his nephew, Ruban Nielson of the group Unknown Mortal Orchestra.  

Bruddah Waltah now lives in Hilo and plays regularly at venues in the Hawaiian Islands and the U.S. mainland.

Awards

 Na Hoku Hanohano Award for best contemporary album

Partial Discography
 Hawaiian Reggae, 1991
 Take My Lovin’, 1994, Platinum Pacific Records
 Ka Hoʻina, 1997, Po’alima Records

References

 

American male singers
American male singer-songwriters
American male guitarists
Guitarists from Hawaii
Native Hawaiian musicians
Musicians from Hawaii
Na Hoku Hanohano Award winners
1955 births
Living people